Carlos María Servín Caballero (born 24 May 1987) is a Paraguayan international footballer who plays for as a goalkeeper for Tacuary Asunción in the Primera División Paraguaya.

Career

Youth career
In 2002, Servin was crowned champion of Paraguay's Primera B with Sportivo Trinidense's youth team. In this, he was teammates with Juan Paniagua and coached by Ruben Pereira.

Tacuary
In 2005, Servin debuted for Tacuary.

On 28 December 2021, it was announced that Servin joined Tacuary for the 2022 season. He was the club's first new signing for the 2022 season.

International career
He made his international debut for Paraguay in 2011.

References

External links
 
 

1987 births
Living people
Paraguayan footballers
Paraguay international footballers
Association football goalkeepers
Paraguayan Primera División players
Primeira Liga players
Club Tacuary footballers
Club Rubio Ñu footballers
Vitória F.C. players
Club Olimpia footballers
Deportivo Santaní players
Deportivo Capiatá players
Club Libertad footballers
Paraguayan expatriate footballers
Expatriate footballers in Portugal